"Has Anybody Seen My Angel" is a song recorded by Canadian country music artist Denise Murray. It was released in 1997 as the second single from her debut album, What You Mean to Me. It peaked at number 10 on the RPM Country Tracks chart in February 1998.

Chart performance

Year-end charts

References

1997 songs
1997 singles
Denise Murray songs